AIFS may refer to

Auckland Integrated Fares System, a predecessor to the proposed public transport payment system for New Zealand
Australian Integrated Forecast System (meteorology)
American Institute For Foreign Study, est. 1964
Arbitration Inter Frame Spacing, a method of prioritizing transmissions on a wireless network
Associazione Italiana Football Sala, the old name for the current Federazione Italiana Football Sala
Australian Institute of Family Studies